Alejandro Silva is a Chilean instrumental heavy metal guitarist, best known as the founder and lead guitarist of his band, Alejandro Silva Power Cuarteto.

Silva started guitar when he was fourteen years old. Other musicians he has played with include Marty Friedman, Joe Satriani, Steve Vai, and Billy Sheehan, on the 2004 G3 tour held in Chile.

He is also a guitar teacher and a sound engineer.

Discography

References
Biografía externa
Cancionero en LaCuerda.net
 "Alejandro Silva llega cargado de guitarras" Article in Crónica de Chile
Guitarristas – Alejandro Silva – El Rincón del Guitarrista
"En Chile queda mucho trabajo para inculcar cultura rockera" Interview.

External links
Alejandro Silva – official site
Guitar Nine Records – Alejandro Silva

1969 births
Living people
Heavy metal guitarists
People from Santiago
Chilean guitarists
Chilean male guitarists
Progressive metal guitarists